The Governing Council of the Cat Fancy (GCCF) is a cat registry, established in 1910 and the largest organisation that registers pedigree cats in the United Kingdom. It was formed from a small number of cat clubs which were registering cats at the time when the modern cat fancy was in its first stages. It is considered to be the original prototype for cat fancy registries. It is an independent body with around 150 member clubs, including specialist breed clubs and area clubs covering particular regions. The GCCF became an incorporated company on 5 November 2010. It licenses cat shows put on by its affiliated clubs with about 135 shows per year. Pedigree cats shown at these shows can gain the titles Champion, Grand Champion, Imperial Grand Champion and Olympian. The latter having three levels, Bronze, Silver and Gold. The word Champion is replaced by Premier for neutered cats. The showing of non-pedigree cats (often referred to as Domestic shorthair and Domestic longhair) and Pedigree Pets is also popular at GCCF shows.

The GCCF also co-ordinates its own show: the Supreme Cat Show, which is famous for being the world's largest cat show and often referred to as the feline equivalent of Crufts. Special awards of UK and Supreme Champion can be gained at this show only.

The GCCF offices are based in Bridgwater and are staffed by people who deal with registrations, publications, show processing & title claims, agendas & minutes and correspondence from breeders, exhibitors, Clubs, Breed Advisory Committees and the general public. They also deal with complaints and breaches of rules, which can sometimes result in disciplinary action and even suspension from Cat Fancy activities. The GCCF is a member of The Cat Group and the World Cat Congress.

The GCCF has set up its own charity: The Cat Welfare Trust, which uses funds raised through the GCCF to find ways of improving the welfare of cats. To date the trust has granted thousands of pounds into key research projects in ringworm vaccination, the feline genome and chronic gingivo-stomatitis in cats.

Breeds

The top three most popular cat breeds registered in the GCCF are the British Shorthair, the Ragdoll and the Siamese. The GCCF registers around 20,000 pedigree cats each year, and currently recognises the following breeds:

Section 1
Persian (Several different colours and patterns)
Exotic Shorthair

Section 2
Birman
Maine Coon
Nebelung
Norwegian Forest Cat
Ragdoll
Siberian
Somali
Turkish Van
Turkish Vankedisi
Ragamuffin

Section 3
British Longhair
British Shorthair (Several different colours and patterns)
Chartreux
Manx
Selkirk Rex

Section 4
Abyssinian
Aztec
Bengal
Cornish Rex
Devon Rex
Egyptian Mau
Korat
LaPerm
Lykoi
Ocicat
Russian
Singapura
Snowshoe
Sokoke
Sphynx
Thai Lilac/Thai Pointed
Toyger

Section 5
Asian (including Bombay and Burmilla)
Tiffanie (Longhaired Asian)
Australian Mist
Burmese
Tonkinese

Section 6
Balinese
Foreign White
Oriental Bicolour
Oriental Shorthair (Several different varieties, including Havana)
Oriental Longhair
Siamese
Suffolk

Breeds with registration-only status
Khao Manee
Turkish Angora
Cymric
German Longhair

See also
List of cat breeds
List of cat registries

References

Bibliography

External links
 GCCF official homepage
 About the Governing Council of the Cat Fancy

1910 establishments in the United Kingdom
Bridgwater
Cat registries
Cats in England
Clubs and societies in the United Kingdom
Organisations based in Somerset
Organizations established in 1910